William George Charlton (10 October 1900 – 20 June 1981) was an English footballer who played as an inside left for South Shields, West Ham United, Newport County, Cardiff City, Tranmere Rovers and Workington.

He made 137 appearances for Tranmere, scoring 74 goals.

References

External links
West Ham career details
Career details on www.11v11.com

1900 births
1981 deaths
Footballers from Sunderland
English footballers
South Shields F.C. (1889) players
West Ham United F.C. players
Newport County A.F.C. players
Cardiff City F.C. players
Tranmere Rovers F.C. players
Workington A.F.C. players
Association football inside forwards